{{Speciesbox
| status = LC
| status_system = IUCN3.1
| status_ref = 
| taxon = Gehyra montium
| authority = Storr, 1982
| synonyms = 
Dactyloperus montium}}

The Centralian dtella (Gehyra montium''''') is a species of gecko endemic to Australia.

References

Gehyra
Reptiles described in 1982
Geckos of Australia